"Black Sun" is a song by American indie rock band Death Cab for Cutie. It is the lead single from their eighth studio album Kintsugi, released on January 26, 2015.

Charts

Weekly charts

Year-end charts

See also
List of Billboard number-one adult alternative singles of the 2010s

References

External links
 .

2015 singles
2014 songs
Death Cab for Cutie songs
Atlantic Records singles
Songs written by Ben Gibbard
Music videos directed by Robert Hales